Homeworld is a 1982 role-playing game supplement for The Mechanoid Invasion published by Palladium Books.

Contents
Homeworld is the final book in The Mechanoid Invasion trilogy, but was designed as a stand-alone game in which the personnel who may have survived the earlier books to the Mechanoid homeworld.

Reception
William A. Barton reviewed Homeworld in The Space Gamer No. 60. Barton commented that "Even with its flaws and lack of slick production, Homeworld is a useful addition to the Mechanoid Invasion - and much superior to the interim Journey."

Reviews
Different Worlds #31 (Nov., 1983)

References

Role-playing game supplements introduced in 1982
Science fiction role-playing game supplements